Euclides da Cunha is a municipality in the state of Bahia in the North-East region of Brazil.

History
The Masakara language and Kaimbé language, both now extinct, were once spoken in the municipality.

Districts
Massacará (created on December 30, 1953)
Aribicé (created on November 5, 1985)
Caimbé (created on November 5, 1985)
Ruilândia

References

Municipalities in Bahia